The Movement for the Restoration of the Ten Commandments of God was a religious movement founded by Credonia Mwerinde and Joseph Kibweteere in southwestern Uganda. It was formed in 1989 after Mwerinde and Kibweteere claimed that they had seen visions of the Virgin Mary. The five primary leaders were Joseph Kibweteere, Joseph Kasapurari, John Kamagara, Dominic Kataribabo, and Credonia Mwerinde.

In early 2000, followers of the religious movement died in a fire and a series of poisonings and killings that were initially considered a group suicide. It was later determined to be a mass murder by the group's leaders after their predictions of the apocalypse failed to come about. In their coverage of that event, BBC News and The New York Times referred to the Movement as a doomsday cult.

Beliefs
The goals of the Movement for the Restoration of the Ten Commandments of God were to obey the Ten Commandments and preach the word of Jesus Christ. They taught that to avoid damnation in the apocalypse, one had to strictly follow the Commandments. The emphasis on the Commandments was so strong that the group discouraged talking, for fear of breaking the Ninth Commandment, "Thou shalt not bear false witness against thy neighbor", and on some days communication was only conducted in sign language. Fasting was conducted regularly, and only one meal was eaten on Fridays and Mondays. Sex was forbidden, as was soap.

Movement leaders declared that the apocalypse would occur on December 31, 1999. The group had a strong emphasis on an apocalyptic end time, highlighted by their booklet A Timely Message from Heaven: The End of the Present Time. New members were required to study it and be trained in its text, reading it as many as six times. They also taught that the Virgin Mary had a special role in the end, and that she also communicated with their leadership. They held themselves akin to Noah's Ark, a ship of righteousness in a sea of depravity.

The Movement developed a hierarchy of visionaries, topped by Mwerinde. Behind them were former priests who served as theologians and explained their messages. Although the group had split from the Catholic Church, had Catholic icons placed prominently, and defrocked priests and nuns in its leadership, ties to the Church were only tenuous.

Background
The recent past of Uganda had been marked with political and social turmoil. The rule of Idi Amin, the AIDS pandemic, and the Ugandan Bush War wreaked havoc across the country. People became pessimistic and fatalistic, and the established Roman Catholic Church was backsliding, enveloped in scandals and the faithful were becoming dissatisfied. In this void, many post-Catholic groups formed in the late eighties as a confused and traumatized populace turned to charismatic self-declared messiahs who renounced the authority of the government and the Church. An example of this phenomenon was the Christian resistance group, the Holy Spirit Movement, which fought against the government of Yoweri Museveni.

A former member of another unrelated sect, Paul Ikazire, would explain his motivation to join the Movement for the Restoration of the Ten Commandments of God, "We joined the movement as a protest against the Catholic Church. We had good intentions. The church was backsliding, the priests were covered in scandals and the AIDS scourge was taking its toll on the faithful. The world seemed poised to end."

History

Founding
The earliest origins of the movement have been traced back to Credonia Mwerinde's father Paolo Kashaku. In 1960 he claimed to have had a vision of his deceased daughter Evangelista, who told him that he would have visions of heaven. This prediction passed in 1988, when he saw Jesus Christ, the Virgin Mary, and Saint Joseph. His daughter Credonia also had similar visions and was involved in a Virgin Cult. In 1989 Kashaku instructed her to spread the message across Uganda on the orders of the Virgin Mary. In that year she would meet Joseph Kibweteere and tell him of their communications.

Joseph Kibweteere claimed to have had a vision of the Virgin Mary in 1984. Credonia Mwerinde also claimed to have had a similar vision in a cavern near Kibweteere's house in Rwashamaire, Uganda. In 1989 the two met and formed the Movement for the Restoration of the Ten Commandments of God, with the mission to spread the Virgin's message about the apocalypse. The group grew rapidly and also attracted several defrocked Catholic priests and nuns who worked as theologians, rationalizing messages from the leadership. Two of the arrivals were the excommunicated priests Paul Ikazire and Dominic Kataribabo.

Middle years
The sect grew in importance with the arrival of Dominic Kataribabo, a respected and popular priest with a PhD from a university in the United States.  In order to obtain more funds for the increasing number of disciples, Kibweteere sold his three other properties, car and milling machines. By the late 1990s, the church had grown into a thriving community, set in pineapple and banana plantations. Members lived communally on land bought by pooling their assets, which they sold when they joined the Movement. Mwerinde claimed to receive messages from the Virgin Mary through a hidden telephone system that communicated through everyday objects. In western Uganda they built houses for recruitment, indoctrination and worship, and a primary school. The year 2000 was settled on as the final, compelling date for the sect's predictions of the apocalypse.

In 1992 the group was ordered out of Rwashamaire by village elders, and moved to Kanungu District, where Mwerinde's father offered an extensive property for their use. In 1994, Paul Ikazire left the sect, taking with him approximately seventy members. By 1997, according to a filing with the government, the Movement's membership was listed at nearly 5,000 people. In 1998, the Ugandan press reported that the Movement had been shut down for unsanitary conditions, use of child labor, and possibly kidnapping children, but the sect was allowed to reopen by the government.

As the new millennium approached preparations for the end mounted. In 1999, the state-owned New Vision newspaper ran an interview with a teenage member. He said, "The world ends next year. There is no time to waste. Some of our leaders talk directly to God. Any minute from now, when the end comes, every believer who will be at an as yet undisclosed spot will be saved."

Apocalypse claims
 
With the new year looming, activity by Movement members became frenzied, their leaders urged them to confess their sins in preparation for the end. Clothes and cattle were sold cheaply, past members were re-recruited, and all work in the fields ceased. January 1, 2000, passed without the advent of the apocalypse, and the Movement began to unravel. Questions were asked of Mwerinde and Kibweteere, and payments to the Church decreased dramatically. Ugandan police believe that some members, who had been required to sell their possessions and turn over the money to the Movement, rebelled and demanded the return of their money. It is believed that events that followed were orchestrated by sect leaders in response to the crisis in the ranks.

Another date was immediately predicted. March 17, 2000, was the new end of the world, a doomsday they said would come "with ceremony, and finality" according to The New York Times. The Movement held a huge party at Kanungu, where they roasted three bulls and drank 70 crates of soft drinks (most being Coca-Cola).  Minutes after the members arrived at the party, nearby villagers heard an explosion, and the building was gutted in an intense fire that killed all 530 in attendance. The windows and doors of the building had been boarded up to prevent people from leaving.

The fire alerted the Ugandan authorities as to what had been occurring in the Movement.  Several days before Movement leader Dominic Kataribabo was seen buying 50 liters of sulfuric acid, which may have started the fire.  Another party was planned for the eighteenth, which officials believe sect leaders had announced in order to mislead authorities as to their plans. The whereabouts of the five principal cult leaders Joseph Kibweteere, Joseph Kasapurari, John Kamagara, Dominic Kataribabo, and Credonia Mwerinde are unknown (all having presumably escaped).

Four days after the church fire, police investigated Movement properties and discovered hundreds of bodies at sites across southern Uganda. Six bodies were discovered sealed in the latrine of the Kanungu compound, as well as 153 bodies at a compound in Buhunage, 155 bodies at Dominic Kataribabo's estate at Rugazi, where they had been poisoned and stabbed, and another 81 bodies lay at leader Joseph Nymurinda's farm. Police stated that they had been murdered about three weeks before the church inferno.

Aftermath
Medical examiners determined that the majority of the 395 individuals who did not die in the fire had been poisoned. Early reports suggested that they had been strangled based on the presence of twisted banana fibers around their necks. After searching all sites, the police concluded that earlier estimates of nearly a thousand dead had been exaggerated, even though the final death toll had settled at 924.

After interviews and an investigation were conducted the police ruled out a cult suicide and instead consider it to be a mass murder conducted by Movement leadership. They believe that the failure of the doomsday prophecy led to a revolt in the ranks of the sect, and the leaders set a new date with a plan to eliminate their followers. The discovery of bodies at other sites, the fact the church had been boarded up, the presence of incendiaries, and the possible disappearance of sect leaders all point to this theory. Additionally, witnesses said that the Movement's leadership had never spoken about mass suicide when they prepared members for the end of the world. A survivor recalled meeting a devout member of the cult with nails and a hammer on his way after he had left the cult. It is believed he is the one who shut the windows with nails to prevent any one from escaping.

The Ugandan government responded with condemnation. President Yoweri Museveni called the event a "mass murder by these priests for monetary gain". Vice president Dr. Speciosa Wandira Kazibwe said, "These were callously, well-orchestrated mass murders perpetrated by a network of diabolic, malevolent criminals masquerading as religious people."

Although it was initially assumed that the five leaders died in the fire, police now believe that Joseph Kibweteere and Credonia Mwerinde may still be alive, and have issued an international warrant for their arrest. In 2014, it was announced by the Uganda National Police that there were reports that Kibweteere was hiding in Malawi.

References

External links

 The Kanungu Fire (multimedia site by Richard Vokes)
 Seven Years Since the Kanungu Massacre
 Movement for the Restoration of the Ten Commandments of God
 Religious Tolerance.org on the Movement 
Books
 Ghosts of Kanungu: Fertility, Secrecy & Exchange in the Great Lakes of East Africa
  The Uganda Cult Tragedy: A Private Investigation
 Ashes of Faith: A Doomsday Cult's Orchestration of Mass Murder in Africa
News
"Religion That Kills", ABC News, 14 February 2001 News story about the phenomenon of cults in Uganda
 BBC – Death cult activities 'ignored'

 
Christian new religious movements
Christian organizations established in 1989
Former Christian denominations
Apocalyptic groups
Mass murder in 2000
1989 establishments in Uganda
Cults
Catholicism in Uganda
20th-century Catholicism